Miami Killian Senior High School is a secondary school located at 10655 SW 97th Ave, Miami, FL 33176 in the Kendall area of unincorporated Miami-Dade County, Florida. The school is part of the Miami-Dade County Public Schools System.

Miami Killian Senior High school is a Cambridge International school.

Academics 
Miami Killian offers over 20 different AP (Advanced Placement) courses, with 15 (approximately) which can be taken for college credit if a student passes the culminating exam at the end of the year.

Demographics
Miami Killian Senior High School is 68% Hispanic or Latino, 21% Black/African American, 10% White, 1% Asian or Asian American.

Notable alumni

Athletics

Baseball
 Andy Barkett - former professional baseball player (Pittsburgh Pirates) and current manager of the Jacksonville Suns
 Marty Bystrom - former professional baseball player (Philadelphia Phillies, New York Yankees)
 Alex Gonzalez - former professional baseball player (Toronto Blue Jays, Chicago Cubs, Montreal Expos, San Diego Padres, Tampa Bay Rays, Philadelphia Phillies)
 Charlie Greene - former professional baseball player (New York Mets, Baltimore Orioles, Milwaukee Brewers, Toronto Blue Jays)

Basketball
 Raja Bell - former Utah Jazz guard of the NBA
 Steve Blake - Detroit Pistons guard of the NBA.
 Ricky Blanton - former forward for the NBA Chicago Bulls and NCAA LSU Tigers.

Football
 Jamie Brown - T, played for DEN,SFO,WAS
 Bret Cooper - football player
 Evan Cooper - DB,  played for PHI,ATL
 Mark Cooper -NFL Lineman, Denver Broncos
 Rufus Ferguson - former Atlanta Falcons running back
 Tony Gaiter - former New England and San Diego Wide Receiver
 Derrick Gibson - former Oakland Raider of the NFL
 Randal Hill - former NFL and University of Miami receiver
 Danny Hope - former head football coach at Eastern Kentucky University and Purdue University
 Jaquan Johnson - Buffalo Bills safety from the University of Miami
 Kennard Cox - DB, played for JAX, SEA
 Lamar Miller - running back for the Houston Texans
 Rod Payne - C,  played for CIN
 Keith Reaser - NFL cornerback, San Francisco 49ers
 Sheldrick Redwine - NFL Safety for the Cleveland Browns from the University of Miami
 Reggie Sutton - DB,  played for NOR
 Sean Taylor - late NFL safety for the Washington Redskins and University of Miami, began his high school football career at Miami Killian High School but transferred to Gulliver Preparatory School
 Pat Thomas_(linebacker) - LB, played for JAX,KAN, 
 Stephen Tulloch - linebacker for the Detroit Lions, Tennessee titans, and the Philadelphia Eagles

Soccer
 Diego Walsh - Midfielder for teams in the MLS, NASL, A-League, USL, and TPL

Other
Alex Caceres - professional UFC fighter
 Jean-Julien Rojer - professional tennis player
 Michael Oliveira - professional boxer
David Avellan - professional WEC fighter and ADCC bronze medalist

Miscellaneous

 Jeff Baena - Filmmaker
 Kent Fuchs - President of the University of Florida (2015–present)
 Michelle Kaufman - sportswriter at the Miami Herald
 Pouya (rapper) - Singer Songwriter
 Andy Slater - sports talk-show host
 Chuck Todd - NBC News' Chief White House Correspondent

Incidents 
During the 1997-1998 school year, The Killian Nine were a group of high school students at Miami Killian High School who, on February 23, 1998, made a satirical pamphlet called "First Amendment" and passed it out to fellow students. The pamphlet contained poems, essays, cartoons, and writings, several of which were deemed objectionable by the school administration. Included were a drawing of a dart through the head of the school's principal, Timothy Dawson. The pamphlet also contained the statement, "I often have wondered what would happen if I shot Dawson in the head and other teachers who have pissed me off." Dawson claimed that he feared for his life in response to the pamphlet. Once school authorities discovered the identities of the Killian Nine, the students were pulled from their classes one by one and threatened with arrest. After the students each gave a written statement, the school security handcuffed them and had them arrested.

On November 19, 2002, 16 year old Killian student Karen Urbina was brutally murdered when she was beaten to death with a baseball bat along with her 18 year old boyfriend Justin Morejon by his 17 year old cousin Jonathon Nodal who was later charged with 2 counts of 1st degree murder and sentenced to life in prison in 2012.

On March 31, 2015 Sophomore defensive end DeAndre Johnson, 15, was stabbed by a 17-year-old female senior with a kitchen knife. She was later charged with felony attempted murder and possession of a weapon on school grounds, according to a district spokeswoman. The school was placed on lockdown following the incident.

On March 8, 2018, 5 female students were arrested for assaulting a female freshman in the cafeteria that was recorded and shared on social media. The five students involved were charged with battery and disruption of a school environment.

On April 13, 2018, 17 year old Angel Lopez was killed while riding his bicycle from the school after being struck by a Florida Highway Patrol trooper while he was attempting to cross Killian Parkway near 107th Avenue on his bicycle.

On February 5, 2018, two former Miami Killian students Adrian Abanto and Abraham Pedilla were accused and charged with burglarizing the school.

References

External links
 

Miami-Dade County Public Schools high schools
Kendall, Florida